Kalyn Ponga (born 30 March 1998) is a professional  rugby league footballer who captains and plays as a  for the Newcastle Knights in the NRL. 

He played for the North Queensland Cowboys in the National Rugby League, New Zealand Māori at international level, and has played for Queensland in the State of Origin series.

Background
Ponga was born in Port Hedland, Western Australia to parents from New Zealand, and is of Māori descent by way of his father's ancestry. He spent an early portion of his life in Newman, Western Australia before moving to Mount Isa, Queensland at the age of 2. In 2006, at the age of 8, he relocated with his family to Palmerston North, New Zealand and spent five years there, where he played a number of sports; including rugby league, touch football, hockey, rugby union, golf and soccer. In 2010, he won New Zealand's under-13 national golf championship.

In 2011, at the age of 13, Ponga and his family returned to Queensland, settling in Mackay. He attended Mackay State High School and was a member of the Rugby League Academy program, as well as playing junior rugby league for Souths Mackay. Also in 2011, he was signed to a scholarship with the Central Queensland NRL bid side.  In 2012, he was selected for the Australian Schoolboys under-15 side, becoming just the second 14-year-old to make the side.

In 2013, Ponga, then a scholarship holder with the Brisbane Broncos, moved to Brisbane. He attended Anglican Church Grammar School and competed for their rugby union side in the prestigious GPS competition, while also playing rugby league for the Easts Tigers in the Cyril Connell Cup. That year he made the Australian Schoolboys under-15 side for the second consecutive year. While in Brisbane, Ponga also began playing Australian rules football and was placed in the Brisbane Lions Talent Academy after being spotted at a representative Rugby league match where he was considered an outstanding prospect.

In December 2013, then 15-year-old Ponga signed a four-year contract with the North Queensland Cowboys. He was pursued by six professional clubs from across three different sports, turning down the Broncos, Melbourne Storm, Sydney Roosters, Queensland Reds and Brisbane Lions to sign with the Townsville-based NRL club. The Lions continued to pursue Ponga after he committed to the Cowboys and it was later revealed he was one month away from sensationally converting to Australian rules football and signing a four-year contract with the Lions in the latter half of 2016.

Playing career

Early career
Ponga played for the North Queensland Cowboys Holden Cup team from 2015 to 2017, playing 44 games, scoring 32 tries and kicking 42 goals for 212 points in his U20s career.

2015
Ponga moved to Townsville where he attended Ignatius Park College, played for the Townsville Stingers in the Mal Meninga Cup. Later on the year Ponga represented Australia in the under 18s touch football at the 2015 Youth Trans Tasman series. In January, he was a member of the QAS Emerging under-18 Origin squad. In August, he made his NYC debut for the Cowboys, coming off the bench in his side's 50-6 victory over the Parramatta Eels in Round 20. It was later revealed that he had missed five months of the season fighting a life-threatening brain infection. He finished the year as the Cowboys' starting fullback, scoring 8 tries in 8 games. In October, he was invited to train with the New Zealand national team in preparation for their tour of Great Britain. In November, he joined the Cowboys' 2016 first grade squad for pre-season training.

2016
In January, Ponga was selected in the QAS under-20s Origin squad. In February, he played in the Cowboys' first-grade side's trial game against the Broncos, scoring a try. In May, Ponga was selected for the Junior Kangaroos and Junior Kiwis but opted not to play. He spent the majority of the season playing for the Cowboys' NYC and was named at fullback in the NYC Team of the Year.

On 16 September, Ponga made his NRL debut on the wing against the Brisbane Broncos in the finals, replacing the injured Antonio Winterstein. Ponga was short from scoring his first NRL try in the 16th minute of the game making a break on the wing getting taken down by Broncos Lock Corey Parker. Since 1987, he is just the sixth player to make his first-grade debut in a finals match. He was contracted to the Cowboys until the end of 2017.

In November, it was reported that Ponga had signed a contract with the Newcastle Knights starting in 2018. On 17 November, when North Queensland returned to pre-season training, head coach Paul Green confirmed the reports and his disappointment saying the contract was in the cooling off period. The deal was officially announced on 28 November as a four-year contract starting in 2018. It was reported that the deal will make him the highest paid teenager in the history of the NRL.

2017
Ponga was named in North Queensland's squad for the 2017 NRL Auckland Nines tournament in February. At the event, he led North Queensland to a quarterfinals berth before being eliminated by the Storm. He scored five tries and was named in the team of the tournament alongside teammate Gideon Gela-Mosby. Ponga played his first NRL game at fullback for the Cowboys in Round 3. During the game, he recorded two line break assists, seven tackle breaks and 113 running metres in their 8-30 loss to the Manly Warringah Sea Eagles. He scored his maiden NRL try in the Cowboys' Round 4 victory over the Gold Coast Titans. He was named man of the match in the Cowboys round 8 victory against the Newcastle Knights after scoring two tries. 

Ponga returned to the North Queensland first-grade lineup in their round 24 clash against the Cronulla-Sutherland Sharks. During the match, he suffered a shoulder injury. He returned two weeks later in the NYC finals elimination loss to Manly. In September, he was named at fullback in the NYC Team of the Year for the second year in a row, before being announced as one of five finalists for the RLPA Rookie of the Year award.

2018
Ponga was eligible to represent Australia and New Zealand in test football, but confirmed his allegiance to Queensland, and therefore Australia, in January 2018. In round 1 of the 2018 season, he made his debut for the Knights in their 19-18 golden point extra-time win over the Manly Warringah Sea Eagles, scoring a try and kicking three goals.

In June, Ponga made his State of Origin debut for Queensland in Game II of the 2018 State of Origin series. He came onto the field from the interchange bench in the 28th minute, playing out of position in the middle of the field. He played 52 minutes, made 29 tackles and made a line break late in the game, coming close to scoring an equalizing try, only to be pulled down by New South Wales fullback James Tedesco before the line in Queensland's 18-14 loss. Former Knights and Australian test  Andrew Johns called it 'the best debut in Origin history.'

2019
On 7 October 2019, Ponga was named in the Australian side for the 2019 Rugby League World Cup 9s. Later that day, Ponga was named in the U23 Junior Australian side.

2020
In June, Ponga extended his contract with Newcastle until the end of 2024, however the last two years of the deal were options in Ponga's favour.

2021
In round 6 of the 2021 NRL season, Ponga scored two tries in a man of the match performance as Newcastle defeated Cronulla-Sutherland 26-22.

In round 16 against North Queensland, Ponga put in a man of the match performance and scored two tries in Newcastle's 38-0 victory.

In Game three of the 2021 State of Origin series, Ponga returned to the Queensland Origin side after missing out on the last 6 matches due to injury. He played a part in Queensland's 20-18 win to prevent a New South Wales white wash for the series.

2022
Ponga had until June of 2022 to activate the options in his contract for the 2023 and 2024 seasons. In April, he signed a new contract for five years, until the end of 2027, that would replace the existing deal moving into 2023.

On 13 July, Ponga put in a man-of-the-match performance in Game 3, the decider of the 2022 State of Origin series, in a Queensland side missing regular five-eighth Cameron Munster. Ponga collected 299 running metres, 90 of which were kick returns and 75 in post-contact, along with 3 line breaks, 18 tackle breaks and the try that claimed the lead which Queensland would not lose for the remainder of the game.
In July, Ponga was ruled out for the remainder of the 2022 NRL season after suffering with concussion. On 15 August, it was revealed that Ponga and teammate Kurt Mann had been ejected from a pub after being found intoxicated in a toilet cubicle by security staff. Ponga and Mann were later drug tested by the NRL under the organisation's drug policy.

2023
In round 2 of the 2023 NRL season, Ponga was taken from the field with a head concussion after just 90 seconds in Newcastle's 14-12 victory over the Wests Tigers. It was Ponga's fourth concussion in ten months.

Achievements and accolades

Individual
NYC Team of the Year: 2016, 2017
RLPA Rookie of the Year: Nominated 2017

Statistics

NRL
 Statistics are correct to 14 July 2022

References

External links

Newcastle Knights profile
NRL profile

1998 births
Living people
Australian people of Māori descent
Australian rugby league players
New Zealand Māori rugby league players
New Zealand Māori rugby league team players
Newcastle Knights captains
Newcastle Knights players
North Queensland Cowboys players
Queensland Rugby League State of Origin players
Rugby league five-eighths
Rugby league fullbacks
Rugby league players from Western Australia
Rugby league wingers
Te Āti Haunui-a-Pāpārangi people